Miguel Aguilar (born 30 August 1993) is a Mexican professional footballer.

College and amateur soccer 
Aguilar's high school years were at Encina Preparatory High School, where he later graduated from in 2011.
Aguilar spent his entire college career at the University of San Francisco where he made a total of 73 appearances and tallied 15 goals and 9 assists. While in college, he was a youth coach for USL League Two side San Francisco Glens' academy.

He also spent the 2014 season with Portland Timbers U23s in the Premier Development League.

Professional career

D.C. United 
Aguilar was drafted in the first round (17th overall) of the 2015 MLS SuperDraft by D.C. United and signed a professional contract with the club.  He made his professional debut on 26 February in a 5–2 defeat to Alajuelense in the first leg of the CONCACAF Champions League Quarterfinal. On August 19, 2015, Aguilar scored his first professional goal against Árabe Unido in the 2015–16 CONCACAF Champions League group stage.

LA Galaxy II 
On December 12, 2016, Aguilar was traded by D.C. along with a fourth-round pick in the 2019 MLS SuperDraft to LA Galaxy in exchange for LA's fourth-round pick in the 2018 MLS SuperDraft. On December 18, 2017, Aguilar signed a new contract with the team after being sidelined for the nearly the whole 2017 season, due to an ACL injury. After the 2018 season, Aguilar's contract ran out.

References

External links

San Francisco Dons bio

1993 births
Living people
Mexican expatriate footballers
San Francisco Dons men's soccer players
Portland Timbers U23s players
D.C. United players
Richmond Kickers players
LA Galaxy II players
Association football midfielders
Footballers from Chihuahua
Soccer players from Sacramento, California
Sportspeople from Ciudad Juárez
Expatriate soccer players in the United States
D.C. United draft picks
USL League Two players
Major League Soccer players
USL Championship players
Mexican footballers